"Shawty Say" is a song produced and performed by David Banner, released as the third single from his fifth studio album, The Greatest Story Ever Told. The song features Lil Wayne and samples his song "Lollipop". The song has a similar vibe to Banner's previous single "Get Like Me". The song was leaked on June 26, 2008 and was officially released on August 1, 2008. Banner utilizes the auto-tune technique for parts of the song.

Music video
The music video was released on August 1, 2008 on MTV's FNMTV. The video features Ryan Sheckler. It starts off as David Banner giving abused girlfriends his card while interrogating their boyfriends. Near the end he invites them to his house for a party.

Charts

References

2008 singles
David Banner songs
Lil Wayne songs
Dirty rap songs
Song recordings produced by David Banner
Songs written by David Banner
Songs written by Lil Wayne
Songs written by Static Major
Songs written by Jim Jonsin
2008 songs